The 2015 European Road Championships were held in Tartu, Estonia. The event consisted of a road race and a time trial for men and women under-23 and juniors. The championships were regulated by the European Cycling Union.

Medal table
 Host nation

Schedule

Individual time trial
Thursday 6 August 2015
 12:30 Women under-23, 18.4 km
 15:00 Women Juniors, 14.4 km

Friday 7 August 2015
 11:00 Men under-23, 31.5 km
 15:00 Men Juniors, 18.4 km

Road race
Saturday 8 August 2015
 09:30 Women Juniors, 74.4 km
 15:00 Women under-23, 124 km

Sunday 9 August 2015
 10:00 Men Juniors, 124 km
 14:00 Men under-23, 161.2 km

Events summary

References

 
European Road Championships, 2015
Road cycling
Road
European Road Championships by year
Sport in Tartu
International cycle races hosted by Estonia